Perth Arena (known commercially as ) is an entertainment and sporting arena in the city centre of Perth, Western Australia, used mostly for basketball matches. It is located on Wellington Street near the site of the former Perth Entertainment Centre, and was officially opened on 10 November 2012. Perth Arena is the first stage of the Perth City Link, a  major urban renewal and redevelopment project which involves the sinking of the Fremantle railway line to link the Perth central business district directly with Northbridge.

About
The arena was jointly designed by architectural firms Ashton Raggatt McDougall and Cameron Chisholm Nicol. With its design based on the Eternity puzzle, the venue holds up to 13,910 spectators for tennis events, 14,846 for basketball (the arena's capacity is capped at 13,000 for National Basketball League regular season games) and a maximum of 15,000 for music or rock concerts. The venue has a retractable roof, 36 luxury appointed corporate suites, a 680-bay underground car park, 5 dedicated function spaces, and touring trucks can drive directly onto the arena floor.

It is owned by VenuesWest (which operates HBF Stadium, HBF Arena, Bendat Basketball Centre, and others) on behalf of The State Government of Western Australia and is managed by AEG Ogden.

The inaugural General Manager of Perth Arena was David Humphreys, former General Manager of the Perth Entertainment Centre and Allphones Arena in Sydney. Humphreys died two months before the venue's opening. AEG Ogden announced Steve Hevern as the interim General Manager on 3 October 2012.

Anchor tenants of Perth Arena include the West Coast Fever, Perth Wildcats and formerly the Hopman Cup.

Construction

The tender for the project was won by Western Australian construction consortium BGC, and work commenced on the site in June 2007.

The construction was marred by controversy in relation to the cost and time blowouts from the original $150 million estimate to $550 million. Auditor General Colin Murphy reported in 2010 that "the initial estimates of the cost and opening date for the Arena were unrealistic and made before the project was well understood or defined." An example of the modifications to the original Arena design is the change of the carpark location from being built above the nearby railway line as a separate project to underneath the Arena itself.

Naming rights
For the first six years of operation, Perth Arena retained its non-commercial name. In September 2018, the venue name was changed to RAC Arena. The Royal Automobile Club of Western Australia (RAC) agreed to a five-year naming rights arrangement, with the deal estimated to be worth about $10 million to the Government of Western Australia. Prior to the name change, the Government of Western Australia had paid around $8 million to stadium operator AEG Ogden as compensation for not being able to sell the naming rights.

Entertainment

On 4 August 2018 Celine Dion performed at this arena for the first time as a part of Celine Dion Live 2018. This was the first show by Dion since Taking Chances World Tour to be held in Perth. On 12 October 2018 Cher also performed for the first time in Perth Arena as part of her Here We Go Again Tour.

In 2022 it was announced that Perth Arena would be the new host for the Channel Seven Perth Telethon.

On September 29 and 30 2022, American singer-songwriter Billie Eilish performed in the arena for her last two Australian shows as part of her tour, Happier Than Ever: The World Tour.

Sports

Basketball

Perth Arena hosted its first National Basketball League game on 16 November 2012 when the Perth Wildcats played (and lost to) the Adelaide 36ers in front of a crowd of 11,562. The attendance was the largest recorded in Western Australia for an indoor event, breaking the previous record of 8,501 set at the Burswood Dome in 2004. The arena has since hosted larger crowds, with the current record being 13,615 set during the Wildcats 101–83 win to the Tasmania Jackjumpers on 19 December 2021 during Round 3 of the 2021–22 NBL Season.

With a capacity of 14,846, Perth Arena is the second largest venue currently in use in the NBL (2016–17) behind the Qudos Bank Arena in Sydney (18,200). The arena is also the third largest venue ever used in the NBL behind Sydney and the Rod Laver Arena in Melbourne (15,400).

Tennis
On 2 January 2019, a record crowd of 14,064 attended the venue for the 2019 Hopman Cup match between United States and Switzerland. This was also the highest attendance for a tennis match in Western Australian history. The stadium hosted the Hopman Cup until the tournament's disbandment. It was chosen by Tennis Australia to host the 2019 Fed Cup Final between Australia and France. Since 2020 the arena has been one of three Australian venues to host ties in the multi-nation ATP Cup tournament. In 2022 it was one of three venues to host the multi-nation mixed-team United Cup tournament.

Netball
Netball was first played at the arena on 27 April 2013, when home team the West Coast Fever lost 49–58 to the Melbourne Vixens in the ANZ Championship. The Fever continued to play occasional matches at the venue over several years, sharing fixtures with the smaller Perth Superdrome. Ahead of the 2018 season the club shifted all home matches to Perth Arena. The crowd of 13,722 at the 2018 Super Netball Grand Final was a domestic league record.

The first international netball test was played at Perth Arena on 30 October 2015 between Australia and New Zealand in the final test of the Constellation Cup.

Other events
The UFC hosted UFC 221: Rockhold vs. Romero at Perth Arena on February 11, 2018.

The UFC hosted UFC 284: Makhachev vs. Volkanovski at Perth Arena on February 12, 2023.

See also
 List of indoor arenas in Australia

References

External links

 
 Perth Arena (archived 27 January 2013)
 AEG Worldwide

Landmarks in Perth, Western Australia
Sports venues in Perth, Western Australia
National Basketball League (Australia) venues
Tennis venues in Australia
Basketball venues in Australia
Netball venues in Western Australia
Music venues in Perth, Western Australia
Indoor arenas in Australia
Retractable-roof stadiums in Australia
Perth Wildcats
West Coast Fever
2012 establishments in Australia
Sports venues completed in 2012
Music venues completed in 2012
Wellington Street, Perth
Perth City Link